Pierre Mousel (10 May 1915 – 6 December 1998) was a Luxembourgian footballer. He competed in the men's tournament at the 1936 Summer Olympics.

References

External links
 
 

1915 births
1998 deaths
Luxembourgian footballers
Luxembourg international footballers
Olympic footballers of Luxembourg
Footballers at the 1936 Summer Olympics
Sportspeople from Luxembourg City
Association football defenders
Jeunesse Esch players